Leval Alphonso Thompson (born 12 October 1954, Kingston, Jamaica), also known as Linval Thompson, is a Jamaican reggae and dub musician and record producer.

Biography
Thompson was raised in Kingston, Jamaica, but spent time with his mother in Queens, New York City, and his recording career began around the age of 20 with the self-released "No Other Woman," recorded in Brooklyn, New York. Returning to Jamaica in the mid 1970s he recorded with Phil Pratt, only to return to New York to study engineering.  Returning again to Jamaica, he worked with Lee "Scratch" Perry at his Black Ark studio, recording "Kung Fu Man", and recorded with Bunny Lee, which resulted in his debut album, Don't Cut Off Your Dreadlocks, in 1976. Thompson began to produce his own material, the first fruits being the Trojan album, I Love Marijuana (1978), and its dub counterpart Negrea Love Dub.  Although he continued to work as a singer, he became increasingly prominent as a producer, working with key artists of the late roots and early dancehall era such as Dennis Brown, Cornell Campbell, The Wailing Souls, Barrington Levy and Trinity, with releases through Trojan Records as well as his own Strong Like Sampson and Thompson Koos record labels.

Thompson's productions were used as the basis of some of Scientist's best-known dub albums. He has also produced albums for Eek-A-Mouse, Freddie McGregor, Ranking Dread, and The Viceroys.

See also
Dub music
List of reggae musicians
List of roots reggae artists

References

External links
Linval Thompson at Discogs

SNWMF bio of Linval Thompson
Interview with Linval Thomson at Reggae Vibes

1954 births
Living people
Jamaican reggae musicians
Jamaican record producers
Dub musicians
Musicians from Kingston, Jamaica
Jamaican Rastafarians
Trojan Records artists
Greensleeves Records artists